The National Forests Office, or ONF, is a Government of France agency that manages the state forests, city forests and biological reserves. ONF is based in Paris.

The office is responsible for the sustainable management of France's approximately 10 million hectares of public forests. The ONF takes over their protection and carries out forestry policing tasks. Around 9,000 civil servants work at the ONF and its regional offices. ONF is under legislation of Ministère de l'Agriculture and Ministère de la Transition écologique et solidaire.

History
ONF was founded in 1964. Since 1980, almost a third of the ONF workforce has been cut. The agency had gone through a series of structural reforms in the 2000s. Le Monde reported in 2012 that 30 forest officials took their own lives between 2002 and 2012. An internal analysis reported demotivation at the workplace, a high level of stress and a serious risk of psychosocial disorder for ONF employees.

Ranks and rank insignia
Officers

Enlisted

References

External links
  Official site

 
Government agencies of France
France
Law enforcement agencies of France
Forestry in France